, better known by his ring name Evil (stylized as EVIL), is a Japanese professional wrestler. He is currently working for New Japan Pro-Wrestling (NJPW).

After debuting in NJPW in 2011, Evil competed in the United States on excursion, working for companies such as Global Force Wrestling (GFW) and Ring of Honor (ROH) from 2014 to 2015. He returned to NJPW in November 2015. He is a former member of Los Ingobernables de Japón, and was a part of a tag team with Sanada; the two are two-time IWGP Tag Team Champions and two-time World Tag League winners. He is also a two-time NEVER Openweight Champion and is a record-breaking six-time and current NEVER Openweight 6-Man Tag Team Champion, making him an overall ten-time champion in NJPW. In 2020, he won the New Japan Cup, before turning on L.I.J leader Tetsuya Naito and joining Bullet Club. He defeated Naito at Dominion to become the double IWGP Heavyweight and Intercontinental Champion. He is the only wrestler in NJPW history to be a triple champion, having held the IWGP Heavyweight and Intercontinental Championships and the NEVER Openweight 6-Man Tag Team Championship simultaneously from July to August 2020.

Professional wrestling career

New Japan Pro-Wrestling (2011–2013)
Watanabe made his debut for New Japan Pro-Wrestling (NJPW) on May 13, 2011, wrestling primarily as a Young Lion and in the lower cards of shows and remained with the promotion until October 2013, when after King of Pro-Wrestling, announced that he was being sent on a learning excursion to the United States.

Ring of Honor (2014–2015)
At Global Wars '15 the first night May 15 he teamed with Silas Young in a losing effort against Gedo and Moose. The following night May 16, he was defeated by Young.

On the June 27 episode of ROH Wrestling, he lost to Adam Page after Colby Corino attacked Watanabe. On the July 4 episode of ROH Wrestling, Dalton Castle would defeat Watanabe. On July 23, ROH announced that House of Truth member Donovan Dijak would battle Watanabe in a singles match taped exclusively for ROH's YouTube Wrestling Channel. This occurred on July 24 at Death Before Dishonor XIII where Dijak defeated Watanabe.

August 22 at Field of Honor, Watanabe qualified for an ROH World Television Championship match by winning a nine-man gauntlet match. On September 18 at All Star Extravaganza VII, he teamed with Will Ferrara to defeat Dijak and Greg James. On September 19, Watanabe received his shot at the Television Title in a match against champion Jay Lethal, but was unsuccessful.

Return to NJPW

The King of Darkness (2015–2017)

On October 12, 2015, Watanabe returned to NJPW at King of Pro-Wrestling, where he was revealed as Tetsuya Naito's associate during his match against Hiroshi Tanahashi. Watanabe's outside interference in the match was stopped by Hirooki Goto and Katsuyori Shibata, leading to Naito suffering a loss. In a post-match interview, Naito gave Watanabe the new name "King of Darkness" Evil. Under the new name, Evil became affiliated with Naito's Los Ingobernables de Japón stable. In December, Evil and Naito won their block in the 2015 World Tag League with a record of five wins and one loss, advancing to the finals of the tournament. On December 9, Evil and Naito were defeated in the finals by Togi Makabe and Tomoaki Honma.

In early March, Evil took part in the 2016 New Japan Cup in which he was eliminated in the first round by Tomohiro Ishii. On March 20, Evil unsuccessfully challenged Ishii for the ROH World Television Championship. From July 18 to August 14, Evil took part in the 2016 G1 Climax where he finished his block with four wins and five losses, thus failing to advance. Despite his failure to advance, Evil scored two big wins by defeating IWGP Intercontinental Champion Michael Elgin and NEVER Openweight Champion Katsuyori Shibata on the last day.

On November 5 at Power Struggle, Evil won his first title, when he defeated Katsuyori Shibata for the NEVER Openweight Championship. Ten days later, Evil lost the title back to Shibata in Singapore. At the end of the year, Evil took part in the 2016 World Tag League, teaming with stablemate Sanada. The two finished second in their block with a record of five wins and two losses, tied with block winners Togi Makabe and Tomoaki Honma, but failed to advance to the finals due to losing the head-to-head match against Makabe and Honma.

On January 4, 2017, at Wrestle Kingdom 11 in Tokyo Dome, Evil, Bushi and Sanada won a four-team gauntlet match to become the new NEVER Openweight 6-Man Tag Team Champions. They lost the title to Hiroshi Tanahashi, Manabu Nakanishi and Ryusuke Taguchi the next day, before regaining it on February 11 at The New Beginning in Osaka. In March, Evil made it to the semifinals of the 2017 New Japan Cup, before losing to Bad Luck Fale. On April 4, L.I.J. lost the NEVER Openweight 6-Man Tag Team Championship to Hiroshi Tanahashi, Ricochet and Ryusuke Taguchi in their second defense, before regaining it on May 3 at Wrestling Dontaku 2017.

During the 2017 G1 Climax on August 5, Evil picked up a major win over reigning IWGP Heavyweight Champion Kazuchika Okada, Okada's first singles defeat in nearly a year. Evil went on to finish third in his block with a record of six wins and three losses. On October 9 at King of Pro-Wrestling, Evil received his first shot at the IWGP Heavyweight Championship, but was defeated by Okada. In December, Evil and Sanada won their block in the 2017 World Tag League with a record of five wins and two losses, advancing to the finals of the tournament. On December 11, they defeated Guerrillas of Destiny (Tama Tonga and Tanga Loa) in the finals to win the tournament. Six days later, Evil, Bushi and Sanada lost the NEVER Openweight 6-Man Tag Team Championship to Guerrillas of Destiny and Bad Luck Fale in their fourth defense.

Championship reigns with Sanada (2018–2020)
On January 4, 2018, at Wrestle Kingdom 12 in Tokyo Dome, Evil and Sanada defeated the Killer Elite Squad (Davey Boy Smith Jr. and Lance Archer) to win the IWGP Tag Team Championship for the first time. Evil and Sanada would successfully defend the IWGP Tag Team Championship on two occasions before losing the title to The Young Bucks at Dominion 6.9 in Osaka-jo Hall ending their reign at 156 days. The same night, Chris Jericho defeated Tetsuya Naito to win the IWGP Intercontinental Championship. After the match, Jericho put Naito into Walls of Jericho and refused to release the hold. This resulted in Evil running in to make the save. Evil entered the 2018 G1 Climax and finished with a record of 5 wins and 4 losses, failing to advance from his block. At King of Pro-Wrestling, Evil was scheduled to compete in a singles match against Zack Sabre Jr. Before the match could begin, however, IWGP Intercontinental Champion, Chris Jericho, would return and attack Evil forcing the match to be a no contest.

On November 3, 2018, at Power Struggle, Evil challenged Jericho for the IWGP Intercontinental Championship. Evil was unsuccessful, however, and was forced to submit to Chris Jericho's Liontamer submission hold. In December, Evil and Sanada entered the 2018 edition of World Tag League. The pair scored a record of ten wins and three losses advancing them to the finals where they would meet the Guerillas of Destiny (Tama Tonga and Tanga Loa) in a rematch of the previous year's final. On December 9, they defeated the Guerillas of Destiny in the finals to win their second World Tag League and the challenge right for an IWGP Tag Team Championship match at Wrestle Kingdom 13 in Tokyo Dome.

At Wrestle Kingdom 13 in Tokyo Dome, Evil and Sanada won IWGP Tag Team Championship in a Three-way tag team match, that also included Guerillas of Destiny and Young Bucks. They retained their titles at The New Beginning in Sapporo against Zack Sabre Jr. and Minoru Suzuki. At Honor Rising: Japan 2019, Evil and Sanada lost the titles in their second defense against Guerillas of Destiny. Evil was announced to take part in the 2019 New Japan Cup, but lost to Zack Sabre Jr. in the first round. Evil entered the 2019 G1 Climax, finishing with a record of 4 wins and 5 losses, failing to make it to the finals.

On January 5, 2020 at Wrestle Kingdom 14, Evil, Bushi and Shingo Takagi defeated four other teams in a Gauntlet match for the NEVER Openweight 6-Man Tag Team Championship, making both Evil and Bushi record-tying four time holders of the title.

Bullet Club (2020–present) 
After New Japan Pro-Wrestling underwent a hiatus in late February 2020 due to the COVID-19 pandemic, the company resumed its activities with the 2020 New Japan Cup, which begun on June 16, 2020, with the winner receiving a title shot against Naito for both the IWGP Heavyweight and IWGP Intercontinental Championships. Entering the tournament, Evil defeated Satoshi Kojima, Hirooki Goto, Yoshi-Hashi, and his teammate Sanada to reach the finals, displaying a more aggressive attitude, notably cheating by low blowing Hirooki Goto in their match, injuring Yoshi-Hashi before their match, and using a chair to attack Sanada’s neck in their match. In the finals on July 11, Evil defeated Kazuchika Okada, in part due to interference by Bullet Club, who attacked Okada seemingly behind Evil's back (as he appeared unconscious when it happened). When Naito came out to congratulate him on his win, Evil threw up the "too sweet" symbol of Bullet Club instead of the raised fist of Los Ingobernables, then attacked Naito, turning heel, and was soon joined by Bullet Club,  establishing himself as a member of the stable and the first person to ever leave Los Ingobernables de Japón.

At Dominion the following day, Evil defeated Naito to capture both the IWGP Heavyweight and IWGP Intercontinental Championships with the help of Bullet Club, including Dick Togo, who joined Bullet Club and became Evil's manager in the process. As Evil was still NEVER Openweight 6-Man Tag Team Champion with Bushi and Takagi despite his betrayal, he became the first triple champion in the history of New Japan Pro-Wrestling. At Sengoku Lord on July 25, he had his first successful defense of both the Heavyweight and Intercontinental titles against former Ingobernables stablemate Hiromu Takahashi. On August 1, NJPW vacated the NEVER Openweight 6-Man Tag Team Championship due to Evil claiming in a post-Dominion interview that he had "no interest" in defending the title with his former Ingobernables stablemates, ending his run as triple champion. He lost both titles against Naito at Summer Struggle in Jingu. On November 6, Evil defeated Chaos to win the NEVER Openweight 6-Man Tag Team Championships with House of Torture at Power Struggle. He defeated Tomohiro Ishii to win the NEVER Openweight Championship at Wrestle Kingdom 16, becoming a double champion. On Night 2, Evil, Sho and Takahashi, once again retained the 6-man titles against CHAOS. On Night 3 Evil and Dick Togo lost to Pro Wrestling NOAH's Go Shiozaki and Masa Kitamiya.

At the NJPW New Years Golden Series tour, EVIL retained the Never Openweight Championship against Ishii once again and retained the Never openweight 6-man tag team championships.  Evil then entered the New Japan Cup, he defeated Ryusuke Taguchi and Tama Tonga in rounds one and two, but lost to Hiromu Takahashi in round 3.   At Hyper Battle, Evil retained the Never Openweight Championship against Takahashi. At Wrestling Dontaku, Evil lost the Never Openweight Championship to Tama Tonga, ending his secoind reign at 117 days. At Dominion 6.12 in Osaka-jo Hall, House of Torture retained the 6-man championships against Suzuki-Gun, but lost them to Chaos at NJPW New Japan Road. 

In June, Evil was announced to be competing in the G1 Climax 32 tournament, in the C Block. He finished the tournament with 6 points, failing to advance to the semi-finals.

Personal life
Watanabe was engaged to wrestler Io Shirai.

Championships and accomplishments

New Japan Pro-Wrestling
IWGP Heavyweight Championship (1 time)
IWGP Intercontinental Championship (1 time)
IWGP Tag Team Championship (2 times) – with Sanada
NEVER Openweight Championship (2 times)
NEVER Openweight 6-Man Tag Team Championship (6 times) – with Bushi and Sanada (3), Bushi and Shingo Takagi (1), Yujiro Takahashi and Sho (2)
New Japan Cup (2020)
World Tag League (2017, 2018) – with Sanada
Pro Wrestling Illustrated
 Ranked No. 29 of the top 500 singles wrestlers in the PWI 500 in 2021
Wrestling Observer Newsletter
Best Gimmick (2017)  as part of Los Ingobernables de Japón
Most Overrated (2021)

References

External links

1987 births
Bullet Club members
IWGP Heavyweight champions
IWGP Intercontinental champions
NEVER Openweight champions
Japanese male professional wrestlers
Living people
Sportspeople from Shizuoka Prefecture
NEVER Openweight 6-Man Tag Team Champions
IWGP Heavyweight Tag Team Champions